The National Memorial Arboretum is a British site of national remembrance at Alrewas, near Lichfield, Staffordshire. Its objective is to honour the fallen, recognise service and sacrifice, and foster pride in the British Armed Forces and civilian community.

In 2017, after undergoing a large scale regeneration project, the Arboretum's new award-winning Remembrance Centre was officially opened by the Duke of Cambridge on 23 March. Featuring three new exhibition galleries, larger restaurant and shop, separate coffee shop and a courtyard with garden, it provides visitors with facilities fitting that of a large scale visitor attraction.

In 2018 the National Memorial Arboretum was awarded Gold Large Visitor Attraction of the Year in VisitEngland's Awards for Excellence, as well as Coach Friendly Attraction of the Year in the British Coach Tourism Awards.

Origins
The idea for the Arboretum was conceived by Commander David Childs CBE in 1988, who wished to establish a national focus or 'centre' for Remembrance to those that had passed after giving to their community or country. Following a meeting with Group Captain Leonard Cheshire VC, an appeal was launched in 1994 by the then Prime Minister, John Major. He believed that the Arboretum would form a living tribute to service men and women for future generations to reflect upon and enjoy while walking through a beautiful green scenery.

The future of the project became assured when three proposals were agreed. These were: for the site to be the location of the Armed Forces Memorial; for the Ministry of Defence to pay a significant grant-in-aid to allow for free entry and that The Royal British Legion would accept the gift of the site as the focus for the Nation's year-round Remembrance.

The project began with no money, no land, no staff and no trees, just an idea which was yet to exist in reality. The National Lottery, in the form of the Millennium Commission, granted some forty per cent of the funds needed and this was matched by thousands of donations, both large and small, from a wide variety of organisations both military and civilian, men and women, corporate and voluntary.

Planting began on the reclaimed gravel workings, bordered by the Rivers Trent and Tame, gifted to the charity by Tarmac Lafarge in 1997. The initial planting took place thanks to grants from the Forestry Commission and the National Forest, and since then has been shaped by a staff of thousands: a small paid group; a dedicated and active Friends of the National Memorial Arboretum organisation; and countless others who have either planted individual trees or helped create a memorial for their organisation.

The Arboretum was officially opened on 16 May 2001. It is a registered charity and is part of The Royal British Legion family of charities.

Location

It is adjacent to the confluence of the River Tame with the River Trent, and directly neighbouring Croxall Lakes. It is at the western end of the National Forest, just off the A38 road.

Features

The Arboretum contains more than 25,000 trees. There are more than 400 memorials for the armed forces, civilian organisations and voluntary bodies who have played a part in serving the country; and even HMS Amethyst's cat Simon. The largest section was the Armed Forces Memorial.

At the heart of the Arboretum is the Armed Forces Memorial, which is a tribute to over 16,000 service personnel who have lost their lives in conflict or as a result of terrorism since the end of the Second World War. At 11 am on 11 November each year the sun shines through two slits in the outer and inner walls of the memorial, casting a shaft of light across a wreath in the centre. The Armed Forces Memorial was dedicated in October 2007 by the Archbishop of Canterbury in the presence of the Queen.

Other areas of the site include an RAF 'wing', Naval review and Army parade. Civilian areas include 'The Beat' which contains memorials and dedications to police forces from around the UK and commonwealth. There is a Wartime Nurses Memorial, to 1,300 VAD and professional nurses who died in the 1st and 2nd World Wars, to find it, 'go to the RAMC memorial. Keeping this and the Polish War Memorial behind you, walk up the grove and go to the footpath beside the river, then a small distance left'.

Within the Arboretum is the Millennium Chapel of Peace and Forgiveness where, at 11 am each day, an act of remembrance takes place. Following the two minutes silence, accompanied by the Last Post and Reveille, there is an introductory talk about the arboretum. The Bastion Memorial commemorates British casualties of the War in Afghanistan (2001–2021). A memorial to the Lisbon Maru was unveiled in 2021.

A 'remembrance glade' was unveiled at the Arboretum by the Royal British Legion in September 2021, featuring plants chosen for their symbolic meanings in relation to grief and new beginnings.

Daily activities on site include guided walks, buggy tours, Land Train rides and free talks, as well as the Daily Act of Remembrance. Most of these activities are conducted by a team of over 260 volunteers, who collectively dedicate more than 52,000 hours of their time per year to the Arboretum. In 2010, the Volunteers of the National Memorial Arboretum were awarded The Queen's Award for Voluntary Service.

Memorials 

Some of the other features of the National Memorial Arboretum are described below.

References

External links

 
 

 
2001 establishments in England
Arboreta in England
British military memorials and cemeteries
Charities based in Staffordshire
Monuments and memorials in Staffordshire
Parks and open spaces in Staffordshire
The Royal British Legion
Protected areas established in 2001